The Diocese of Toul was a Roman Catholic diocese seated at Toul in present-day France. It existed from 365 until 1802. From 1048 until 1552 (de jure until 1648), it was also a state of the Holy Roman Empire.

History 
The diocese was erected in 338 AD by St. Mansuetus. The diocese was a suffragan of the ecclesiastical province of Trier. In 550 AD, the Frankish Council of Toul was held in the city. 

By the high Middle Ages, the diocese was located at the western edge of the Holy Roman Empire; it was bordered by France, the Duchy of Bar, and the Duchy of Lorraine. In 1048 it become a state of the Empire while that city of Toul itself became a Free Imperial City.

In 1552, both states were annexed by King Henry II of France; the annexations were formally recognized by the Empire in 1648 by the Peace of Westphalia. By then, they were part of the French province of the Three Bishoprics.

In 1766, the Duchy of Lorraine became part of France. In 1777 and 1778, territory was carved out of Toul to form two new dioceses: Saint Dié and Nancy, both of them suffragans of Trier. By the terms of the Concordat of 1802, Toul was suppressed. Its territory was merged with that of Nancy to form a new diocese —  the Diocese of Nancy-Toul with it seat in Nancy. The geographic remit included three Departments of France: Meurthe, Meuse, and Vosges.

List of bishops and prince-bishops

Bishops
 Mansuetus 338–375, first bishop
 Amon c. 400?
 Alchas c. 423?
 Gelsimus c. 455?
 Auspicius c. 478?
 Ursus around 490
 Aprus (Aper) 500–507
 Aladius 508–525?
 Trifsorich 525–532
 Dulcitius 532?–549
 Alodius c. 549
 Premon 
 Antimund
 Eudolius c. 602
 Theofred 640–653
 Bodo of Toul c. 660
 Eborinus around 664
 Leudinus 667?–669
 Adeotatus 679–680
 Ermentheus c. 690?
 Magnald c. 695?
 Dodo c. 705
 Griboald 706–739?
 Godo 739?–756
 Jakob 756–767
 Borno 775–794
 Wannich 794?–813
 Frotar 814–846
 Arnulf 847–871
 Arnald 872–894
 Ludhelm 895–905
 Drogo 907–922
 Gosselin 922–962
 Gerard I 963–994 (Saint Gerard)
 Stephen 994–995
 Robert 995–996
 Berthold 996–1019
 Herman 1020–1026

Prine-bishops
 Bruno Egisheim-Dagsburg † (1026 - 12 February 1049; elected as Pope Leo IX, served until his death in 1054) 
 Sede Vacant 1049-1051
 Odo 1052–1069
 Pippo 1070–1107
 Richwin of Commercy 1108–1126
 Henry I of Lorraine 1127-1167
 Peter of Brixey 1168–1192
 Odo of Vaudemont 1192–1197
 Matthias of Lorraine 1197–1206, † 1217
 Reinald of Chantilly 1210–1217
 Gerard II of Vaudemont 1218–1219
 Odo II of Sorcy 1219–1228
 Garin 1228–1230
 Roger of Marcey 1231–1251
 Giles of Sorcy 1253–1271
 Conrad II of Tübingen 1272–1296
 John I of Sierck 1296–1305
 Vito Venosa 1305–1306
 Odo III of Grançon 1306–1308
 Giacomo Ottone Colonna 1308–1309
 John II of Arzillières 1309–1320
 Amatus of Geneva 1320–1330
 Thomas of Bourlemont 1330–1353
 Bertram de la Tour 1353–1361
 Pietro di la Barreria 1361–1363
 John III of Hoya 1363–1372
 John IV of Neufchatel 1373–1384, † 1398
 Savin de Floxence 1384–1398
 Philip II de la Ville-sur-Illon 1399–1409
 Henry II de la Ville-sur-Illom 1409–1436
 Louis de Haraucourt 1437–1449
 William Fillatre 1449–1460
 John V de Chevrot 1460
 Anthony I of Neufchatel 1461–1495
 Ulric of Blankenberg 1495–1506

 Hugh des Hazards 1506–1517
 John, Cardinal of Lorraine  1517–1524, † 1544 (Bishop of Verdun 1523–1544)
 Hector de Ailly-Rochefort 1526–1532
 John, Cardinal of Lorraine (again) 1532–1537
 Anthony II Pellagrin 1537–1542
 John of Lorraine-Guise (again) 1542–1543, † 1544

Bishops after the French annexation
 Toussaint de Hossey 1543–1565
 Peter III de Châtelet 1565–1580
 Charles de Lorraine de Vaudémont 1580–1587 (Bishop of Verdun 1585–1587)
 Christopher de la Vallée 1589–1607
 John VII Porcelet de Maillane 1609–1624
 Nicholas II, Duke of Lorraine 1625–1634
 Charles Christian de Gournay 1634–1637
 Henri Arnauld 1637-1643
 Paolo Fiesco 1643–1645
 Jacques Lebret 1645
 Henri-Pons de Thiard de Bissy 29 March 1687 to 10 May 1704 (Bishop of Meaux 1704–1737)
 François Blouet de Camilly 1706–1723
 Scipion-Jérôme Begon 1723–1753
 Claude Drouâs de Boussey 1754–1773
 Etienne-François-Xavier des Michels de Champorcin (Stephen-Francis-Xavier des Michels de Champorcin), last bishop, 1773–1802

See also
 Catholic Church in France
 List of Catholic dioceses in France

References

Bibliography

Reference Sources
 pp. 548–549. (Use with caution; obsolete)
  p. 301. (in Latin)
 p. 175.

 p. 219.

Studies

External links
 Bishopric of Toul at Catholic-hierarchy.org

Former Roman Catholic dioceses in France
Roman Catholic dioceses in the Holy Roman Empire
 
Upper Rhenish Circle
Dioceses established in the 4th century
States and territories established in 1048
365 establishments
4th-century establishments in Roman Gaul
4th-century establishments in the Roman Empire
1824 disestablishments in France
360s in the Roman Empire
Toul